Matthias Bornhäuser (also spelled Bornhaeuser, born 5 January 1974) is a German former windsurfer. He competed in the men's Mistral One Design event at the 1996 Summer Olympics.

References

External links
 
 

1974 births
Living people
German male sailors (sport)
German windsurfers
Olympic sailors of Germany
Sailors at the 1996 Summer Olympics – Mistral One Design
People from Reutlingen
Sportspeople from Tübingen (region)